The Humorist (Jumorist) is a 2019 drama film directed and written by Mikhail Idov.

Plot 
The film is set in the mid-80s. In the center of the plot is a successful Soviet humorist Boris Arkadyev, who, despite universal love and recognition, lacks creative freedom, as a result of which he becomes dangerous for society.

Cast
 Alexey Agranovich as Boris Arkadyev, a Jewish Soviet humorist
 Yuri Kolokolnikov as Maxim Shelepin
 Alisa Khazanova as Elvira, Arkadyev's wife
 Polina Aug as Lina
 Artem Grigoryev as K.G.B. agent
 Olga Dibtseva as Galina	
 Anatoliy Kotenyov as general Yasenev
 Pavel Ilin as Budovsky, a concert manager
 Vilma Kutaviciute as Inara
 Semyon Shteynberg as Semyon Grinberg, a humorist

References

External links 
 
 

2019 films
Russian drama films
Czech drama films
Latvian drama films
Films about Jews and Judaism